The London 9s is a rugby league nines tournament held annually in London, United Kingdom by East London RFC. It was first held in 2018 with the Wan Papua Warriors taking the men's title and Castleford Tigers taking the women's tournament.

Results

Rules
The vast majority of rules is played under the rugby league 9s format of the sport although major rule changes include:
Fifteen minute games 
No half time
Unlimited interchange

See also
Rugby league nines

References

External links
London 9s website

Rugby league nines
Rugby league nines competitions in the United Kingdom
Rugby league in London